KPBZ (90.3 FM) is a radio station licensed to Spokane, Washington, United States. The station is one of three owned by Spokane Public Radio, the others being KPBX and KSFC. Programming consists entirely of PRX Remix, an internet-delivered format offered by Public Radio Exchange.

References

External links
Spokane Public Radio website
PRX Remix website

PBZ
Public radio stations in the United States
Radio stations established in 1986
1986 establishments in Washington (state)